is a Japanese horticulturist, creator of the variety of begonia Kimjongilia dedicated to North Korean leader Kim Jong-il.

He is known for creating and maintaining a number of bird and flower theme parks in Japan, including the following.
 
 Fuji Kachoen (1990) (:ja:富士花鳥園)
 Matsue Vogel (2001)
 Kamo Iris Garden (2003) in Kakegawa, Shizuoka (:ja:掛川花鳥園)
 Kobe Kachoen (2003) in Kobe

References 

1930 births
Living people
Japanese gardeners